The retinal nerve fiber layer (RNFL) or nerve fiber layer, stratum opticum,  is formed by the expansion of the fibers of the optic nerve; it is thickest near the optic disc, gradually diminishing toward the ora serrata.

As the nerve fibers pass through the lamina cribrosa sclerae they lose their medullary sheaths and are continued onward through the choroid and retina as simple axis-cylinders.

When they reach the internal surface of the retina they radiate from their point of entrance over this surface grouped in bundles, and in many places arranged in plexuses.

Most of the fibers are centripetal, and are the direct continuations of the axis-cylinder processes of the cells of the ganglionic layer, but a few of them are centrifugal and ramify in the inner plexiform and inner nuclear layers, where they end in enlarged extremities.

Patients with retinitis pigmentosa have abnormal thinning of the RNFL which correlates with the severity of the disease. However the thickness of the RNFL also decreases with age and not visual acuity. The sparing of this layer is important in the treatment of the disease as it is the basis for connecting retinal prostheses to the optic nerve, or implanting stem cells that could regenerate the lost photoreceptors.

RNFL is a sensitive structure which may vary based on ethnicity. Some process can excites its natural apoptosis. Harmful situation can make some damage on RNFL such as high intraocular pressure, high fluctuation on phase of intraocular pressure, inflammation, vascular disease and any kind of hypoxia. Gede Pardianto (2009) reported 6 cases of RNFL thickness change after the procedures of phacoemulsification. Sudden intraocular fluctuation in any kind of intraocular surgeries maybe harmful to RNFL in accordance with mechanical stress on sudden compression and also ischemic effect of micro emboly as the result of the sudden decompression that may generate micro bubble that can clog micro vessels. Glaucoma is the lead cause of irreversible blindness in contemporary times. Furthermore, greater research in the RNFL and even optic nerve head (ONH) abnormalities, can pave the way for early detection and diagnosis of glaucoma

References

External links
 

Human eye anatomy